James Male ( – January 15, 1947) was an American lawyer and politician from New York.

Life 
Male was born in around 1896 in New York City, New York. He attended Townsend Harris High School, the City College of New York, and Fordham University, graduating from the latter school with an LL.B. He then began an active law practice in New York City.

In 1921, Male was elected to the New York State Assembly as a Democrat, representing the New York County 19th District. He served in the Assembly in 1922, 1923, and 1924. He lost the 1924 re-election to Republican Abraham Grenthal. He then worked as assistant district attorney and assistant corporation counsel. He later moved to Pelham Manor, where he worked in the real estate business and served as Town Justice in 1936.

Male was a member of the Improved Order of Red Men.

Male died while vacationing in Havana, Cuba on January 15, 1947. He was buried in Ferncliff Cemetery.

References

External links 

 The Political Graveyard

1890s births
1947 deaths
Townsend Harris High School alumni
City College of New York alumni
Fordham University School of Law alumni
20th-century American lawyers
Lawyers from New York City
20th-century American politicians
Democratic Party members of the New York State Assembly
People from Pelham Manor, New York
American real estate businesspeople
Burials at Ferncliff Cemetery